Chalaneh-ye Olya (also Romanized as Chalāneh-ye ‘Olyā; also known as Chalānī-ye ‘Olyā and Chīlāneh-ye Bālā) is a village in Mansur-e Aqai Rural District, Shahu District, Ravansar County, Kermanshah Province, Iran. At the 2006 census, its population was 184, in 39 families.

References 

Populated places in Ravansar County